Barrymore is a surname.

Barrymore may also refer to:

Barrymore family, an American acting family
Barrymore (barony), a barony in County Cork in Ireland
Earl of Barrymore, a title in the Peerage of Ireland
Barrymore (play), a 1996 play by William Luce
Barrymore (TV series), a British light entertainment show
Barrymore (film), a 2011 Canadian drama film